Whitehorse Creek is a significant stream in western Alberta, Canada. It flows from the Canadian Rockies, and is the first major tributary of the Mcleod River, a major tributary of the Athabasca River.

At its origin, just east of Jasper National Park, Whitehorse Creek forms from the meltwater of Mount Gregg and Mount Bryant.  The creek flows east, taking on Harlequin Creek and Drummond Creek, before meeting the Mcleod.

See also
List of Alberta rivers

Rivers of Alberta